The Bronze Age (c. 3300–1200 BC) marks the emergence of the first complex state societies, and by the Middle Bronze Age (mid-3rd millennium BC) the first empires.
This is a list of Bronze Age polities.

By the end of the Bronze Age, complex state societies were mostly limited to the Fertile Crescent and to China, while Bronze Age tribal chiefdoms with less complex forms of administration were found throughout Bronze Age Europe and Central Asia, in the northern Indian subcontinent, and in parts of Mesoamerica and the Andes (although these latter societies were not in the Bronze Age cultural stage).

West Asia

North Africa

Americas

Europe

Eurasian Steppe and Central Asia

East Asia

South Asia

See also
 Copper Age state societies 
 List of Iron Age states (c. 1200–600 BC)
 List of Classical Age states (c. 600 BC–200 AD)
 List of former sovereign states
List of ancient great powers
List of largest empires

References

External links
History Files
Livius Ancient History Articles
World History Maps (individual) from 1300 BC to 1500 AD

Bronze Age states
Bronze Age
List of states
Bronze Age countries